William Nassau de Zuylestein, 2nd Earl of Rochford (1682 – 27 July 1710), styled Viscount Tunbridge from 1695 to 1709, was a British Army officer and Whig politician who sat in the Irish House of Commons from 1705 and in the British House of Commons from 1708 until 1709 when he succeeded to the peerage and sat in the House of Lords. He was killed in battle.

William Nassau de Zuylestein was baptized on 9 July 1682, the eldest son of William Henry Nassau de Zuylestein, 1st Earl of Rochford, and his wife  Jane Wroth, daughter of Sir Henry Wroth of Durrants, Enfield, Middlesex.

Tunbridge   was an aide-de-camp to John Churchill, 1st Duke of Marlborough in Flanders in 1704, and was commissioned a lieutenant-colonel in the 32nd Regiment of Foot in January 1706. On 12 April, he received a commission as the colonel of a new regiment of foot, part of the Irish army, and on 1 February 1707, he was appointed colonel of the 3rd Regiment of Dragoons (succeeding the late Lord Cutts), which embarked for Spain in 1708.

Tunbridge was returned for the Whig party as an Irish Member of Parliament for Kilkenny City in 1705. He was returned as Member of Parliament  for Steyning at the 1708 British general election. In January 1709, he succeeded his father as Earl of Rochford, and vacated his seat in the House of Commons to sit in the House of Lords. He was commissioned a brigadier general in January 1710. 

Rochford was killed on 27 July 1710 at the Battle of Almenar while leading his regiment, aged 28. He was succeeded by his brother Frederick Nassau de Zuylestein, 3rd Earl of Rochford.

References
Dictionary of National Biography, in article on his father.

1682 births
1710 deaths
32nd Regiment of Foot officers
British military personnel of the War of the Spanish Succession
Tunbridge, William Nassau de Zuylestein, Viscount
Tunbridge, William Nassau de Zuylestein, Viscount
Irish MPs 1703–1713
Tunbridge, William Nassau de Zuylestein, Viscount
Tunbridge, William Nassau de Zuylestein, Viscount
Members of the Parliament of Ireland (pre-1801) for County Kilkenny constituencies
Earls of Rochford
British military personnel killed in the War of the Spanish Succession